Second sight is an alleged extra-sensory vision of future events or of things or events at a remote location.

Second Sight may also refer to:

Film and television
 Second Sight (film), a 1989 comedy film starring John Larroquette and Bronson Pinchot
 "Second Sight" (Star Trek: Deep Space Nine), a 1993 episode of Star Trek: Deep Space Nine
 "Second Sight" (Midsomer Murders), a 2005 episode of Midsomer Murders
 Second Sight, a 2007 made-for-television film featuring Calum Worthy
 Second Sight (TV series), a crime drama starring Clive Owen that aired from 2000–2001
Second Sight (TV series), a Russian crime drama set in Moscow that aired in 2016
 Second Sight: A Love Story, a 1984 television film starring Elizabeth Montgomery
 Second Sight (The Avengers), a 1963 episode of the British espionage TV series

Music
 Second Sight (Lonnie Mack album) an album by the artist Lonnie Mack
 Second Sight (Marc Johnson album), a 1987 album by jazz bassist Marc Johnson
 "Second Sight", an album by Jami Sieber
 "Second Sight", a song by Kula Shaker from Strangefolk
 "Second Sight", a song by Placebo from Sleeping with Ghosts
 "Second Sight", a song by David Darling from the soundtrack of the film Child's Play
 "Second Sight", a song by The Dolphin Brothers on their album "Catch The Fall", released 1987.
 Second Sight, a mid-1990s era band featuring Vince Welnick and Bob Bralove
 Second Sight (Hey Rosetta! album), an album released October 21, 2014

Other uses
 Second Sight, a 2005 novel by Gary Blackwood
 Second Sight (video game), a 2004 action-adventure video game
 Second Sight (Sapphire and Steel), an audio play based on the British television series Sapphire & Steel
 Second Sight, a non-profit organisation founded by Lucy Mathen
A phenomenon seen with increasing myopia in development of nuclear cataract
 Second Sight Medical Products
 Second Sight (BBS software), bulletin board system program

See also
 Second Sighting, a 1988 album by Frehley's Comet